The tribe Caesalpinieae is one of the subdivisions of the plant family Fabaceae: subfamily Caesalpinioideae.

Genera
Caesalpinieae once included many more genera, but modern molecular phylogenetics indicated that these should be transferred to other clades. Caesalpinieae currently comprises the following genera:

Arquita E. Gagnon, G. P. Lewis & C. E. Hughes 2015
Balsamocarpon Clos 1846
Biancaea (Tod. 1860) E. Gagnon & G. P. Lewis 2016

Caesalpinia (L. 1753) E. Gagnon & G. P. Lewis 2016

Cenostigma (Tul. 1843) E. Gagnon & G. P. Lewis 2016

Cordeauxia Hemsl. 1907
Coulteria (Kunth 1824) E. Gagnon, Sotuyo & G. P. Lewis 2016

Denisophytum (R. Vig. 1948) E. Gagnon & G. P. Lewis 2016
Erythrostemon (Klotzsch 1844) E. Gagnon & G. P. Lewis 2016
Gelrebia E. Gagnon & G. P. Lewis 2016

Guilandina L. 1753

Haematoxylum L. 1753
Hererolandia E. Gagnon & G. P. Lewis 2016
Hoffmannseggia Cav. 1798
Hultholia E. Gagnon & G. P. Lewis 2016

Libidibia (DC. 1825) E. Gagnon & G. P. Lewis 2016
Lophocarpinia Burkart 1957

Mezoneuron Desf. 1818

Moullava (Adans. 1763) E. Gagnon & G. P. Lewis 2016

Paubrasilia  E. Gagnon, H. C. Lima & G. P. Lewis 2016

Pomaria Cav. 1799
Pterolobium R. Br. ex Wight & Arn. 1834

Stenodrepanum Harms 1921
Stuhlmannia Taub. 1895
Tara (Molina 1789) E. Gagnon & G. P. Lewis 2016
Ticanto Adans. 1763

Zuccagnia Cav. 1799

Phylogenetics
Caesalpinia, as traditionally circumscribed, was paraphyletic, so it was recently recircumscribed to produce many new genera:

Notes

References

External links
 
 

 
Caesalpinioideae
Fabaceae tribes
Taxa named by Ludwig Reichenbach